The People's Journal, first published in 1858,  was a Dundee-based Scottish periodical, originally produced by John Leng & Co., a local publishing company that for a time enjoyed the Scottish artist, political cartoonist, postcard illustrator and publisher Martin Anderson (better known by his pseudonym Cynicus) as a member of its staff. Another contributor was Camilla Dufour Crosland. Latterly, The People's Journal was produced by the regional publisher D.C. Thomson & Co. The last edition was published on Saturday 11 January 1986. It carried poetry by readers, including William McGonagall.

Editors included William Duncan Latto and Robert Paterson.

References

Newspapers established in 1858
Publications disestablished in 1986
Mass media in Dundee
1858 establishments in Scotland
1986 disestablishments in Scotland
Defunct newspapers published in the United Kingdom